Club Puebla Premier was a professional football team that plays in the Mexican Football League. They were playing in the Liga Premier (Mexico's Third Division). Puebla Fútbol Club Premier was affiliated with Puebla F.C. who plays in the Liga MX. The games were held in the city of Puebla in Los Olivos.

Players

Current squad

References

Football clubs in Puebla
Liga Premier de México